The South African Railways NG 0-4-0T of 1899 was a narrow-gauge steam locomotive from the pre-Union era in Transvaal and Natal.

In 1899, Rand Mines acquired two narrow-gauge  steam locomotives from Avonside Engine Company and, in 1900, a similar locomotive was delivered to Reynolds Brothers Sugar Estates of Esperanza in Natal. In 1915, when an urgent need arose for additional narrow-gauge locomotives in German South West Africa during the First World War, these three locomotives were purchased second-hand by the South African Railways.

Manufacturer
In 1899, Avonside Engine Company delivered two  locomotives to Rand Mines on the Witwatersrand. In 1900, a third similar locomotive, but of  gauge, was delivered to Reynolds Brothers Sugar Estates in Natal. The latter was one of several of the same type which saw service on the Reynolds, Huletts and Chakaskraal sugar plantations in Natal.

First World War
In 1915, while the military campaign was in progress against German forces in Deutsch-Südwest-Afrika (DSWA) during the First World War, an urgent need arose for additional locomotives for use on the narrow-gauge lines in that territory. The South African Railways (SAR) therefore purchased these three 0-4-0T locomotives second-hand on behalf of the Defence Department. The two engines from Rand Mines were numbered NG91 and NG92, while the engine from Reynolds Brothers was numbered NG95. Since a narrow-gauge locomotive classification system had not yet been implemented on the SAR, they were not classified.

Service
Whether all three were placed in service by the SAR is not certain, since engine no. NG95 from Reynolds Brothers would not be usable without first being regauged to  gauge. It is also unclear whether any of them were actually placed in service in DSWA or whether they were used to replace other SAR narrow-gauge locomotives which had been commandeered by the Union Defence Forces for war service in DSWA.

The locomotives were withdrawn from SAR service and sold towards the end of the war in 1918.

References

2520
0-4-0T locomotives
B locomotives
Avonside locomotives
2 ft gauge locomotives
Railway locomotives introduced in 1899
1899 in South Africa
Scrapped locomotives